Jarred Blakiston (born 1991) is a New Zealand-born actor and writer.

Background
He spent his childhood in Auckland and was educated at St Peter's College.

Acting career
Blakiston is best known for his year-long role, from 2004 to 2005, and then recurring in 2007, in New Zealand's longest running soap, Shortland Street, playing the role of Daniel Potts, son of Dr Sarah Potts (Played by Amanda Billing). In 2007 he appeared in The Tattooist in the role of the young Jake Sawyer. He was formerly signed with Red11 modelling agency after being scouted at a popular Auckland CBD nightclub. He appeared in the  film The Hobbit: An Unexpected Journey in the role of Musical Elf. Other film and television roles include "customer" in Power Ranges Megaforce, "Ethan Poindexter" in Amazing Extraordinary Friends, and "Laurence" in P.E.T Detectives. In 2015, he joined the cast of Power Rangers Dino Charge cast in the recurring role of Prince Phillip III of Zandar, who eventually becomes the Dino Charge Graphite Ranger.

References

External links

Living people
1991 births
New Zealand male television actors
People educated at St Peter's College, Auckland
People from Auckland